2020–21 UAE Division one was the 44th Division one season. Since last season was cancelled and no promotion was rewarded, there were no team changes taken place this season. On the 17 April, both Al Urooba and Emirates secured promotion after defeating Dhaid and Masafi  respectively.

Stadia and locations

Note: Table lists clubs in alphabetical order.

Personnel and kits

Note: Flags indicate national team as has been defined under FIFA eligibility rules. Players may hold more than one non-FIFA nationality.

 Foreign players 
All teams could register as many foreign players as they want, but could only use two on the field each game.

Players name in bold''' indicates the player is registered during the mid-season transfer window.
Players in italics were out of the squad or left the club within the season, after the pre-season transfer window, or in the mid-season transfer window, and at least had one appearance.

Managerial changes

League table

Results

Season Statistics

Top ScorersAs of 24 April 2021''

Number of teams by Emirates

References

UAE
2020–21 in Emirati football